The Karelian hot pot (British) or Karelian stew (US) (ragu po-karelski) is a traditional meat stew originating from the region of Karelia. It is commonly prepared using a combination of pork and beef, but elk or lamb can also be used. Along with the Karelian pasties (karjalanpiirakat), it is the most widely recognised Karelian food in Finland. In 2007, it was selected as the national dish of Finland by the readers of the Finnish tabloid Iltalehti. In similar poll organized by the ELO Foundation for the Promotion of Finnish Food Culture in cooperation with the Central Union of Agricultural Producers and Forest Owners MTK and the Finnish Ministry of Agriculture and Forestry in autumn 2016, Karelian hot pot took second place, losing to rye bread.

The hot pot is usually seasoned with black peppercorns and salt. Other seasonings such as allspice and bay leaf may be used too. Common vegetables such as carrot, onion, and root vegetables are acceptable additions to the stew.

Like most other Karelian foods, the Karelian hot pot is traditionally braised (cooked in a pot (uuniruukku or potti in Finnish) placed inside an oven). In Karelia, it is usually referred to as merely 'oven stew' (uunipaisti). The term Karelian hot pot can be used to refer to nearly any food that contains meat and that is prepared in this traditional Karelian fashion.

Due to the scarceness of meat in the past, the hot pot was traditionally only prepared for festive occasions. As meat became more readily available during the 20th century, the dish became a common, everyday food throughout Finland.

See also
 List of stews

References

External links

Finnish stews
Karelia
National dishes